Saint Paul's Evangelical Lutheran Church is a congregation in the Indiana District of the Lutheran Church–Missouri Synod (LCMS) located at the intersection of Barr and Madison Streets in Fort Wayne, Indiana. Founded in 1837, it is the second oldest Lutheran church in Indiana and the oldest in the northern part of the state. Thanks largely to its size and to the leadership of its pastors, it has long played a prominent role in Indiana Lutheranism and in the LCMS as a whole.

The present church building was first completed and dedicated in 1889, but a 1903 fire forced a near-complete rebuild of the structure. It was added to the National Register of Historic Places in 1982.

History 
The congregation was organized in 1837 and erected its first church building in 1939, on the same site as the present building. Growth of the congregation led to a larger church building being constructed in 1847, with an addition in 1862. Although two daughter congregations branched off to form new parishes during the next two decades, it again became necessary to provide more ample facilities.

The new building was designed by the architectural firm of Wing & Mahurin in the High Victorian Gothic style. By September 15, 1889, a large church had been erected. On December 3, 1903, a major fire left it in ruins. Reconstruction was soon underway, and by April 1905 it had been restored to its former glory. During the late 1940s the church underwent renovation and has had other improvements and enhancements as time went on.

The church was added to the National Register of Historic Places on March 1, 1982.

See also
List of tallest buildings in Fort Wayne

References

Further reading
Bertram, Martin H., A Brief History of St. Paul's Ev. Lutheran Church, Fort Wayne, Indiana (1962)
Burger, Mildred L., A Short History of the Lutheran Church—Missouri Synod in Fort Wayne, Indiana (Fort Wayne: Fort Wayne Public Library, 1967)
Sauer, H. G. and J. W. Miller, Geschichte der Deutschen Ev.-Luth. St. Pauls-Gemeinde zu Fort Wayne, Ind., vom Jahre 1837 bis zum Jahre 1912 : Zum fünfundsiebzigsten Jubiläum der Gemeinde (St. Louis: Concordia Publishing House, 1912)
West, Thomas E. and Joan E. West, Now Thank We All Our God: St. Paul's Evangelical Lutheran Church 175th Anniversary (Fort Wayne: 2012)

Gallery

External links

Official site
LCMS congregation profile
Locating Lutheranism profile

Religious organizations established in 1839
Lutheran churches in Indiana
National Register of Historic Places in Fort Wayne, Indiana
Culture of Fort Wayne, Indiana
Churches in Fort Wayne, Indiana
Churches on the National Register of Historic Places in Indiana
Gothic Revival church buildings in Indiana
Churches completed in 1889
19th-century Lutheran churches in the United States
19th-century Lutheran churches
1839 establishments in Indiana
Lutheran Church–Missouri Synod churches